The 2019 Men's Under-21 Eight Nations Hockey Tournament was the an invitational men's under-21 field hockey tournament, organised by the Real Federación Española de Hockey. The tournament took place from 10 to 16 June 2019 in Madrid, Spain. It was held at the Federación Madrileña de Hockey and Club de Campo.

Germany won the tournament, defeating Spain 2–1 in the final. Belgium finished in third place after defeating Australia 4–3 in penalties following a 2–2 draw.

Teams
The tournament featured teams from three confederations:

Results

Preliminary round

Pool A

Pool B

Classification round

Fifth to eighth place classification

Crossover

Seventh and eighth place

Fifth and sixth place

First to fourth place classification

Semi-finals

Third and fourth place

Final

Statistics

Final standings

Goalscorers

References

External links
International Hockey Federation

2019 in field hockey
International field hockey competitions hosted by Spain
Sports competitions in Madrid
21st century in Madrid
EuroHockey Junior Championship
EuroHockey Championship